Keeper is a surname. Notable people with the surname include:

 Brady Keeper (born 1996), Canadian ice hockey defenseman 
 Cyril Keeper (born 1943), Canadian politician
 Joe Keeper (1886–1971), Canadian long-distance runner
 Tina Keeper (born 1962), Canadian activist, actress and politician
 Tilly Keeper (born 1997), British actress